The George Westinghouse Award may refer to:
 George Westinghouse Medal given by the American Society for Mechanical Engineering
 George Westinghouse Award (ASEE) given by the American Society for Engineering Education
 Intel Science Talent Search awards
 American Association for the Advancement of Science (AAAS) Westinghouse Science Journalism Award, formerly known at different times as the AAAS Science Journalism Award and the AAAS Kavli Science Journalism Award